Denis McNamara (25 August 1926 – 19 November 2009) was a British wrestler. He competed in the men's freestyle heavyweight at the 1964 Summer Olympics.

He was a British heavyweight champion and represented England and won a bronze medal in 100 kg heavyweight, at the 1962 British Empire and Commonwealth Games in Perth, Western Australia. He then competed at the next two Commonwealth Games and won consecutive bronze medals at the 1966 British Empire and Commonwealth Games in Kingston, Jamaica and the 1970 British Commonwealth Games in Edinburgh, Scotland.

References

1926 births
2009 deaths
British male sport wrestlers
Olympic wrestlers of Great Britain
Wrestlers at the 1964 Summer Olympics
Sportspeople from London
Commonwealth Games medallists in wrestling
Wrestlers at the 1962 British Empire and Commonwealth Games
Wrestlers at the 1966 British Empire and Commonwealth Games
Wrestlers at the 1970 British Commonwealth Games
Commonwealth Games bronze medallists for England
Medallists at the 1962 British Empire and Commonwealth Games
Medallists at the 1966 British Empire and Commonwealth Games
Medallists at the 1970 British Commonwealth Games